The superior phrenic vein, i.e., the vein accompanying the pericardiacophrenic artery, usually opens into the azygos vein.

References

Veins of the torso